Robert McConnell may refer to:
Sir Robert McConnell, 1st Baronet (1853–1927), Lord Mayor of Belfast, 1900–1901
Robert McConnell (loyalist) (1944–1976), Northern Irish loyalist
Robert W. McConnell (1806–1862), early settler in Illinois, namesake of McConnell, Illinois
Rob McConnell (1935–2010), Canadian jazz valve trombonist and composer
Brian McConnell, Baron McConnell (Robert William Brian McConnell, 1922–2000), Ulster Unionist MP in the Northern Ireland House of Commons
Bertie McConnell (Robert Dodd McConnell, born 1921), Army officer and politician in Northern Ireland
 R. A. McConnell (1914–2006), American physicist and parapsychologist
 Bob McConnell (1925–2012), founding member of the Society for American Baseball Research
Robert McConnell of the McConnell baronets